Joseph L. Hamilton (April 1, 1919 – December 15, 2014) was an American football coach.  Hamilton was the fourth head football coach at Ithaca College located in Ithaca, New York, serving for five seasons, from 1951 to 1955, and compiling a record of 7–22–3. He served as an emeritus professor at Ithaca.

References

External links
 

1919 births
2014 deaths
Ithaca Bombers football coaches